Jewell Glacier is a short glacier flowing south-southwest from Mount Grant into Jossac Bight on the south coast of South Georgia. It was named by the UK Antarctic Place-Names Committee in 1982 after John A. Jewell, a British Antarctic Survey field assistant in this area in 1976–77, at Rothera Research Station in 1977–78, and Base Commander at Rothera, 1978–80.

See also
 List of glaciers in the Antarctic
 Glaciology

References

Glaciers of South Georgia